Baron  was a Japanese admiral in the early days of the Imperial Japanese Navy.

Biography
Dewa was born as the son of a samurai of the Aizu domain (present day Fukushima prefecture). As a youth, he enlisted in the Byakkotai, a reserve unit of the Aizu domain's official military. The Byakkotai was called into action, and Dewa served at the Battle of Aizu in the Boshin War.

Dewa attended the 5th class of the Imperial Japanese Naval Academy, graduating 6th out of 43 cadets. He was appointed a midshipman on 16 August 1878, promoted to ensign on 12 August 1880 and promoted to sub-lieutenant on 27 February 1883. He was promoted to lieutenant on 7 April 1886 and to lieutenant-commander on 16 October 1890. From 1886-1890, he was executive officer on the cruiser .

During the First Sino-Japanese War (1894–95), Dewa served as a staff officer of the "Western Seas Fleet", a defensive force patrolling home waters. In 1893, he became Director of the Personnel Section in the Navy Ministry. He later captained the cruiser  in 1898.

Promoted to rear admiral on 20 May 1900, and vice admiral on 6 June 1904, during the Russo-Japanese War he was a commander of the 3rd Cruiser Squadron of the IJN 1st Fleet and took part in the naval Battle of Port Arthur, and the Battle of the Yellow Sea, (where he commanded from the cruiser ). During the decisive Battle of Tsushima he led the Third Squadron from his flagship, the cruiser .

In December 1905, he was appointed Commander-in-Chief of the IJN 3rd Fleet, and from November 1906 was Director of the Naval Education Bureau.

On 3 December 1907, Dewa was elevated to the peerage with the title of danshaku (baron) under the kazoku system.

Later, he was successively Commander-in-Chief of the IJN 2nd Fleet, Sasebo Naval District, and the IJN 1st Fleet.

On 9 July 1912, he was promoted to full admiral. Dewa Shigeto was the first non-Satsuma person (and the first Aizu person) to attain the rank of full admiral in the Imperial Japanese Navy. The first person of Aizu background to attain the rank of admiral was Hidematsu Tsunoda, and Matsudaira Morio the son of the former Aizu lord Matsudaira Katamori as a rear admiral.

On the occasion of the Siemens-Vickers Navy Armament Scandal, as Chairman of the Commission of Inquiry he concentrated his efforts on the cleanup of corruption from the Navy. This eventually led to the fall of Admiral Yamamoto Gonnohyōe's cabinet in March 1914. Dewa retired from active service in 1925.

In his later years, Dewa was involved with the construction of memorials to the casualties of the Battle of Aizu. His grave is at the Aoyama Cemetery in Tokyo.

Honors
From the article in the Japanese Wikipedia
  Order of the Sacred Treasure, 4th Class
  Grand Cordon of the Order of the Rising Sun (1 April 1906)
  Order of the Golden Kite, 2nd Class (1 April 1906)
 Baron (21 September 1907)
  Grand Cordon of the Order of the Rising Sun with Paulownia Flowers (27 January 1930; posthumous)
  Grand Cordon of the Order of the Plum Blossoms of the Korean Empire

References

Books

Notes

External links

1856 births
1930 deaths
Imperial Japanese Navy admirals
Samurai
Kazoku
People of the Boshin War
Japanese military personnel of the First Sino-Japanese War
Japanese military personnel of the Russo-Japanese War
People of Meiji-period Japan
People from Aizu
Recipients of the Order of the Rising Sun
Imperial Japanese Naval Academy alumni